The 2000 Icelandic Men's Football League Cup was the fifth staging of the Icelandic Men's League Cup. 36 teams took part.

The competition started on 3 March 2000  and concluded on 4 September 2000 with Grindavík beating Valur 4-0 in the final.

Details
 The 36 teams were divided into six groups of six teams. Each team played one match with other teams in the group once. The top two teams from each group qualified for the second round along with the best four third placed teams.

Group stage

Group A

Group B

Group C

Group D

Group E

Group F

Knockout stage

Second round

Quarter-finals

Semi-finals

Final

See also
Icelandic Men's Football Cup
Knattspyrnusamband Íslands - The Icelandic Football Association
Icelandic First Division League 2000

References
RSSSF Page - Deildabikar 2000

2000 domestic association football cups
2000 in Icelandic football
Icelandic Men's Football League Cup